Sub-Center line of Beijing Suburban Railway (BCR) is a commuter rail line in Beijing. It runs from Liangxiang railway station in Fangshan District to Qiaozhuang East railway station in Tongzhou District. It provides faster service to reach Beijing's sub-administrative center in Tongzhou from central Beijing. The line is currently  in length with 6 stations.

History
Beijing West, Beijing, Beijing East,
and Tongzhou started the Sub-Center line service on 31 December 2017. Qiaozhuang East started the Sub-Center line service on 20 June 2019. Liangxiang started the Sub-Center line service on 30 June 2020.

Stations

References

Railway lines in China
Rail transport in Beijing
Railway lines opened in 2017
Standard gauge railways in China